Evangeline is a 1980s comic book co-created and written initially by then-husband and wife team Chuck Dixon and Judith Hunt, with pencils by Hunt and inks by Ricardo Villagran. Letters were by cartoonist and letterer Ed King of the Star Wars comic strip.

The art for the first few issues of Evangeline was unusual for the time period, in that it was not printed using process color, but instead each page was hand-painted by Hunt and then color separated. This method was introduced by the newly formed independent comic companies and was encouraged by the cheaper printing methods of the 1980s. Cover paintings were also illustrated by Hunt and Villagran.

The title character has been described as "a sexy killer vigilante nun" taking her instructions directly from her mentor, Cardinal Szn, a politically powerful figure in the hierarchy of the Roman Curia/Vatican during the 23rd-century. However, co-creator Hunt would describe her skilled but naive  feminist character as created "to explore the infinite conflict between good and evil and the powerful religions which would be involved in manipulating the politics and economics of the future".

Publication history 
A short introductory story in Comico's Primer #6, and two issues, Guns of Mars (loosely based on the Spaghetti Western film genre) and Hate Boat, were published by Comico Comics in 1984. An ownership dispute in 1985 led to Evangeline leaving Comico, resulting in a 1986 special from Lodestone Comics that reprinted the two Comico issues with additional pages bridging the stories (an epilogue to Guns of Mars and a prologue to "Dinosaur Farm" from the First Comics series), and then a 12-issue run from 1987 to 1989 published by First Comics. Hunt co-wrote and illustrated only the first few issues of the First Comics series, leaving to pursue her design and illustration licensing work for HA! Henson Associates and Macmillan Publishing on Raggedy Ann and Andy. In an interview with the Comics Buyer's Guide, Judith Hunt said that (after she left), "the comic [Evangeline] lost its original complexity and feminist standpoint and became just another excuse for depictions of gratuitous sex and violence".

The first three issues were made available at EvangelineTheComic.com, with announced-but-delayed plans to continue with new material which would continue on after issue #3, not following the continuity of the later First Comics issues. The announced writer for the new material was Ben Dixon, Chuck Dixon & Hunt's son, with announced art by Hunt for one story. However, no new material was added to the website after January 2009, and the "News" section has not been updated since July the same year. As of 2016, the site is gone.

Cultural references 
The Matthew Sweet album, Girlfriend, featured a song titled "Evangeline", sung from the point of view of character Johnny Six.

References

External links 
 

Comico Comics titles
First Comics titles
1984 comics debuts
1989 comics endings
Feminist comics
Action-adventure comics
Science fiction comics
Comics about women
Comics set in the 23rd century
Comics characters introduced in 1984
Vigilante characters in comics